KBMB (710 AM) is a radio station licensed to Black Canyon City, Arizona. Owned by Entravision Communications, it broadcasts a Spanish-language Sports format.

History
KUET went on the air November 23, 1981. The first station for Black Canyon City, KUET broadcast a full-service format. The station, a 500-watt daytimer, was owned by the Black Canyon Broadcasting Company (William Ledbetter and John Gates) and had studios at Metrocenter. However, KUET struggled to find an audience in Phoenix, and on November 7, 1984, it went dark when Harris Corporation repossessed its transmission equipment.

KUET's license was sold to Statewide Broadcasters, Inc., in 1985. Statewide set about the task of increasing KUET's power to 50,000 watts day and adding nighttime service. Statewide's application was put into comparative hearing with a bid from Tucson's KVOI to move from 690 to 700 kHz and increase its power, but KUET won out. However, KUET would remain off the air throughout the 1990s. The station was sold in 1997 to Z-Spanish Media Group. Z-Spanish claimed KUET's original  towers, on federal land, were inadequate, and the group proposed to erect an array of seven  towers in a move that drew local opposition. Residents gathered signatures to put the construction of the new towers to referendum. While Yavapai County Superior Court ruled that no referendum was necessary in a win for Z-Spanish, the Arizona Court of Appeals overturned the verdict and found that signatures gathered by circulators from outside Yavapai County were valid. In the midst of the fighting, Z-Spanish was absorbed by Entravision Communications.

Ultimately, the 7-tower setup was approved, and on January 18, 2002, KUET received program test authority to begin broadcasting for the first time since 1984 as an English-language oldies station. The new KUET also became the carrier of Arizona State Sun Devils women's basketball and baseball in the fall of 2002 under a three-year deal. However, on January 7, 2003, KUET became a Spanish oldies station with new KMIA call letters, and the ASU sports migrated elsewhere. Sports would return to KMIA in February 2006 when the station became a carrier of the new ESPN Deportes Radio network.

The station's transmitter was vandalized on March 4, 2006, when a person burned the steel support rods on four of the seven towers with a torch, causing them to crash to the ground. The station had returned to the air by the end of March 2006, but at severely reduced power. In 2007, another tower problem arose when the FCC fined KMIA for failing to maintain the lights on five towers.
KMIA became KBMB on July 9, 2010; the call letters had previously belonged to an Entravision-owned FM outlet in Sacramento that became KHHM two weeks earlier.

In September 2019, with the looming shutdown of the ESPN Deportes Radio network, all Entravision-owned affiliates flipped to Jose—a format featuring norteño and ranchera music. It has since returned to Spanish sports with programming from TUDN Radio as of August 2020.

References

External links

BMB
Radio stations established in 1981
1981 establishments in Arizona
Entravision Communications stations
BMB
Sports radio stations in the United States